Lasin is a settlement in Chipwi Township, Kachin State, Burma.

References

Populated places in Kachin State